John Windham (born June 23, 1964) is an American football coach. He served as the head football coach at Sewanee: The University of the South from 1996 to 2006, compiling a record of  45–61. Windham was the defensive coordinator Colorado College from 1990 to 1995, Gardner–Webb University from 2007 to 2010, and Furman University from 2011 to 2014. He most recently served as the head football coach at Easley High School in Easley, South Carolina, where he tallied of mark of 20–23 in four seasons before resigning in November 2018.

Playing career
Commonly known as "Squeezebox", Windham lettered at Vanderbilt University, where he played defensive end for the Commodores. In the 1985 season he led the team in both tackles for loss and sacks. Following the 1986 NFL Draft, Windham signed as an undrafted free agent with the New England Patriots. He was subsequently released during training camp the following August.

Head coaching record

College

References

1964 births
Living people
American football defensive ends
Colorado College Tigers football coaches
Furman Paladins football coaches
Mississippi State Bulldogs football coaches
Sewanee Tigers football coaches
Gardner–Webb Runnin' Bulldogs football coaches
Vanderbilt Commodores football players
West Alabama Tigers football coaches
High school football coaches in South Carolina
People from Sumner County, Tennessee